"Armed and Dangerous" is a song by American rapper Juice Wrld, released as a single on October 15, 2018. The music video for the song was released in October, however was taken down and re-released in November. The track was later included as part of a Spotify, Tidal, Deezer, YouTube Music and Pandora exclusive reissue of Juice Wrld’s debut studio album Goodbye & Good Riddance, on December 10, 2018. The track was not included on the May 28, 2021, reissue of the album, commemorating the third anniversary of the project.

Critical reception
HotNewHipHop stat the track "recalls the vibe" of Juice Wrld's debut album Goodbye & Good Riddance and "would fit in nicely alongside his more party-friendly joints as he sings about how he has no need to hire a bodyguard since he's got the stick on him at all times". XXL said "Armed and Dangerous" "finds Juice getting back in his bag", calling it a "free associative" track "where the melodically inclined artist spits about his come-up while firing off some flexes and self-aware bars".

Music video
The video, directed by Cole Bennett, is composed primarily of clips of Juice Wrld's live performances, along with scenes where he is shown lip syncing to the song, and getting ready for a concert. It has over 257 million views as of January 20, 2023.

Track listing

Charts

Weekly charts

Year-end charts

Certifications

Release history

References

2018 singles
2018 songs
Juice Wrld songs
Songs written by Juice Wrld
Songs written by Dre Moon